Ray County Poor Farm, also known as Ray County Historical Society and Museum, is a historic poor farm located at Richmond, Ray County, Missouri.  It was built in 1909–1910, and is a two-story, "Y"-shaped brick building encompassing contains approximately 14,400 square feet of space.  It was originally used to house and care for the poor and indigent.  It currently houses a local history museum.

It was added to the National Register of Historic Places in 1979.

References

History museums in Missouri
Government buildings on the National Register of Historic Places in Missouri
Government buildings completed in 1910
Buildings and structures in Ray County, Missouri
National Register of Historic Places in Ray County, Missouri